The Kostabi World Trade Center was an envisioned building in New York City, United States. Designed by Mark Kostabi in the 1990s, it would have had 160 floors and would have been 2,000 feet (609.6 m) high. It was one of the many ideas for the World Trade Center site. The floor plates at the base of the building contain more than 200,000 square feet. It was proposed in the late 1990s as the world's tallest building by developer Mark Kostabi.
Structural types: highrise, sphere
Architectural style: postmodern
Material: glass

External links
Kostabi World Trade Center at SkyscraperPage

Unbuilt buildings and structures in the United States
Residential skyscrapers in Manhattan
Skyscraper office buildings in Manhattan
Unbuilt skyscrapers